is a Japanese surname. Notable people with the surname include:

Daiki Wakamatsu (born 1976), former Japanese football player
Don Wakamatsu (born 1963), former Major League Baseball manager
Kenji Wakamatsu (born 1972), former Japanese football player
Kōji Wakamatsu (1936–2012), Japanese film director
Setsurō Wakamatsu (born 1949), Japanese film director
, Japanese baseball player
Toshihide Wakamatsu (born 1965), Japanese actor
Takehiko Wakamatsu (born 1969), Japanese sumo wrestler and coach
Tsutomu Wakamatsu (born 1947), Japanese baseball player
Utako Wakamatsu (born 1981), Japanese former competitive figure skater

Japanese-language surnames